Fire in the Straw (French: Le feu de paille) is a 1939 French drama film directed by Jean Benoît-Lévy and starring Lucien Baroux, Orane Demazis and Gaby Basset.

The film's art direction was by Robert-Jules Garnier.

Cast
 Lucien Baroux as Antoine Vautier 
 Orane Demazis as Jeanne Vautier  
 Gaby Basset as Reine Roy  
 Jean Fuller as Christian Vautier  
 Jeanne Fusier-Gir as Madame Goulevin, la concierge  
 Florence Luchaire as La petite Caroline  
 Jeanne Helbling as Monica  
 Henri Lanoë as Désiré, le fils de la concierge  
 Raymond Aimos as Guérétrain  
 Henri Nassiet as Despagnat 
 Stéphane Audel 
 Edmond Beauchamp
 Andrée Brabant 
 Albert Broquin 
 Robert Brunet
 Claire Gérard 
 Jane Pierson 
 Pierre Sarda 
 Adrienne Trenkel 
 Jacques Vitry

References

Bibliography 
 Philippe Rège. Encyclopedia of French Film Directors, Volume 1. Scarecrow Press, 2009.

External links 
 

1939 drama films
French drama films
1939 films
1930s French-language films
Films directed by Jean Benoît-Lévy
French black-and-white films
1930s French films